The Institut National de la Recherche Biomédicale (INRB) is the national medical research organization of the Democratic Republic of the Congo. The responsible ministry is the Ministry of Scientific Research and Technology.

The National Biomedical Research Institute (INRB) was founded in 1984, it is a 70,000 m² establishment. It has been a collaborating center of the World Health Organization since 2018, headed by Professor Jean-Jacques Muyembe-Tamfum, MD, Ph., Which serves as a national biomedical research laboratory for the Ministry of Health of the Democratic Republic of Congo (DRC) ). It is a multidisciplinary institute which collectively has hundreds of years of experience both in the identification, treatment and prevention of diseases in the DRC. Its foundations are the performance of medical and biological analyzes, applied and translational research, the surveillance of communicable diseases and the promotion of professional growth and development. The INRB has continuously developed and trained quality researchers and produced exceptional results, more recently concrete efforts in terms of control, prevention and research in the context of the current Ebola epidemic.

He has continuously brought his expertise to the government of the DRC in the area of disease surveillance, prevention and intervention. In 30 years of existence, the INRB has quickly become recognized worldwide and has played an essential role in tropical health research.

The establishment is a modern type structured research institute composed of six laboratories dedicated to Virology, Parasitology, Bacteriology, Medical Entomology, Clinical Biology and Pathology, including a Research Center on animals and a data center. Each laboratory is made up of a dedicated director and staff, including both students and international collaborators. Each laboratory has the basic equipment and the space necessary for optimal research. It is available to faculty, students, post-docs and staff from the periphery of the INRB. Due to the structure of the INRB if sharing and access to individual laboratory equipment is required, access is granted at the request and approval of the directors of these laboratories. The INRB common area includes some major equipment. All collaborators and researchers have, upon request, several -80 freezers, liquid nitrogen tanks, centrifuges, water baths, tissue homogenizers, vortexes, incubators, agitators; and all laboratories have access to cold chain equipment such as dry shippers and portable freezers.

The INRB was founded in 1984, and has been a World Health Organization collaborating centre since 2018. The INRB and the World Health Organization have worked closely together in research into the effectiveness of the ring vaccination strategy in the 2018 Kivu Ebola outbreak.

The National Biomedical Research Institute (INRB) has eight dynamic departments within it which participate in the various missions of the Institute, namely, monitoring, research and training. The departments work in inter-collaboration on several research themes. Each department has qualified staff and state-of-the-art infrastructure.

Below is the list of the institute's departments:
 Pathology Laboratory,
 Clinical Biology Laboratory,
 Virology Laboratory,
 Parasitology Laboratory,
 clinical microbiology Laboratory, 
 The immunology unit,
 The data center and
 The administration.

The INRB is based at Avenue de la Démocratie (formerly the Avenue des Huileries), BP 1197 in Kinshasa-Gombe, DRC.

References 

Medical research institutes
Research institutes in the Democratic Republic of the Congo
Medical and health organisations based in the Democratic Republic of the Congo
World Health Organization collaborating centres
1984 establishments in Africa
National public health agencies